Sora Jung (born as Kim Seo-ra on 29 January 1968) is a South Korean television actress.  Her first appearance was the role of Kim Hyon-hui in the film Mayumi directed by Shin Sang-ok based on the bombing of Korean Air Flight 858. She appeared in the sixth episode of the first season of Lost, entitled House of the Rising Sun, portraying an "interior decorator", which is actually a guise — instead, she helps Sun-Hwa Kwon flee the country. She has an MBA degree in acting/theater.

References

External links 
 

1968 births
Living people
Mystic Entertainment artists
South Korean film actresses
South Korean television actresses
South Korean web series actresses
Actresses from Seoul
Chung-Ang University alumni
20th-century South Korean actresses
21st-century South Korean actresses